2α-Mannobiose is a disaccharide. It is formed by a condensation reaction, when two mannose molecules react together, in the formation of a glycosidic bond.

References

Disaccharides